Wayne Collins (born 24 June 1967) was an Australian rugby league footballer who played in the 1980s and 1990s.

Early career
He had played junior rugby league for the Merimbula-Pambula Bulldogs, during which time he was a state representative.

Playing career
A former Canberra Raiders lower grade hooker, Wayne Collins cemented a first grade spot after moving to St. George Dragons in 1991. He played with the St. George Dragons for four seasons between 1991 and 1994 which included two grand Final appearances in 1992 and 1993.  Collins later joined the South Queensland Crushers in 1995 and stayed until 1996 before finishing his career at the Leeds Rhinos in 1997.

Coaching career
Wayne Collins was previously an assistant coach at the Canberra Raiders, Penrith Panthers and the South Sydney Rabbitohs and was the Head Coach of the St George Illawarra Jersey Flegg side.

In 2020 he signed on with the Wests Tigers as the Head Coach of the Canterbury Cup side.

In October 2021, Collins was signed by St Marys Saints to coach their Ron Massey Cup team in the 2022 season.

References

St. George Dragons players
Canberra Raiders players
South Queensland Crushers players
Leeds Rhinos players
1967 births
Australian rugby league coaches
Australian rugby league players
Living people
Rugby league hookers
Country New South Wales Origin rugby league team players